The Montney Formation is a stratigraphical unit of Lower Triassic age in the Western Canadian Sedimentary Basin in British Columbia and Alberta.

It takes the name from the hamlet of Montney and was first described in Texaco's Buick Creek No. 7 well by J.H. Armitage in 1962.

Lithology
The formation is composed of siltstone and dark grey shale, with dolomitic siltstone in the base and fine grained sandstone towards the top. The facies is shaley in the north and west of the extent (Fort St. John), silty in the center (Dawson Creek and Pouce Coupe areas) and becomes coarser (sandy) in western Alberta (Valleyview area).

Oil and gas production
The Montney Formation is a major shale gas and tight oil resource.  A comprehensive joint study on the potential of the Montney Formation was completed by the National Energy Board, British Columbia Oil and Gas Commission and the Alberta Energy Regulator in 2013. This study found that the potential resources contained within the formation were 449 trillion cubic feet of marketable natural gas, 14,521 million barrels of marketable natural gas liquids (NGLs) and 1,125 million barrels of oil.  This estimate makes it one of the largest known gas resources in the world and equivalent to 145 years of Canada's 2012 consumption.

Gas is produced from the Montney Formation in both British Columbia and Alberta.  Major operators include Seven Generations Energy Ltd., Progress Energy Canada Ltd. (a subsidiary of Malaysia's (PETRONAS), Painted Pony Energy Ltd., Royal Dutch Shell plc, Encana Corporation, Murphy Oil Corporation, ARC Resources Ltd., and Advantage Oil & Gas Ltd. and oil is produced from the formation in Northern Alberta. Horizontal drilling and extensive fracturing process is necessary to have the fluid flow through the low permeability siltstone. Shale gas extraction emerged in the late 2000s in the distal facies of the formation's western extent.

Hydraulic fracturing in Canada

Massive hydraulic fracturing has been widely used in Alberta since the late 1970s. The method is currently used in development of the Cardium, Duvernay, Montney and Viking formations in Alberta, Bakken formation in Saskatchewan, Montney and Horn River formations in British Columbia.

Distribution

Relationship to other units
Montney Formation is unconformably overlain by Jurassic or Cretaceous beds such as the Doig Formation or Fernie Group and unconformably underlain by the Permian or Carboniferous strata such as the Belloy Formation.

References

Shale formations
Geologic formations of Alberta
Stratigraphy of British Columbia
Oil-bearing shales in Canada
Natural gas fields in Canada
Western Canadian Sedimentary Basin
Early Triassic
Triassic Alberta
Triassic British Columbia
Triassic System of North America